The 2007 Nicky Rackard Cup began in June 2007. It was the third time this element of the All-Ireland Senior Hurling Championship was played. Both Roscommon and Armagh easily progressed to the final in Croke Park, averaging winning margins of 23 and 14 points respectively in the early rounds. In a tense final, the Rossies ran out two-point winners, substitute Gary Fallon scoring the crucial goal. Report

Format

Twelve teams participated in the 2007 Nicky Rackard Cup.

Group 3A: Armagh, Sligo, Tyrone
Group 3B: Donegal, Leitrim, Longford
Group 3C: Fermanagh, Monaghan, Roscommon
Group 3D: Cavan, Louth, Warwickshire

Top two in each group advanced to quarter-finals.

Results

Group 3A

Group 3B

Group 3C

Group 3D

Knockout stages

Final

Nicky Rackard Cup
Nicky Rackard Cup